"Sinister" is a song by American rapper Cordae, released on December 3, 2021, as the second single from his second studio album From a Birds Eye View (2022). It features American rapper Lil Wayne and was produced by Hit-Boy, with co-production from Audio Anthem.

Composition
In the chorus, Cordae raps about his plan of staying in the rap game for at least 20 years, and shouts out to Hit-Boy as well. Toward the end of the song, Lil Wayne raps his verse, using "dizzying wordplay".

Critical reception
Jon Powell of Revolt wrote that the song sees Cordae "bringing some of his hardest bars to date". Wongo Okon of Uproxx commented that both rappers "strike fire for an impressive lyrical onslaught."

Live performances
On January 11, 2022, Cordae performed the song on The Tonight Show Starring Jimmy Fallon along with "Chronicles".

Music video
The music video was directed by Edgar Esteves, and references the Black Panther Party. In it, Cordae and Lil Wayne lead a "revolution" of bringing about the success of Cordae's own record label Hi-Level. Cordae plays the role of an activist, while Lil Wayne is a guest speaker. The two stand in front of a group of their followers as leaders.

Charts

References

2021 singles
2021 songs
Cordae songs
Lil Wayne songs
Atlantic Records singles
Song recordings produced by Hit-Boy
Songs written by Lil Wayne
Songs written by Hit-Boy